Patrick Francis Cleary (5 February 1874 – 1 April 1959) was an Australian rules footballer who played with Collingwood in the Victorian Football League (VFL).

Family
The son of Patrick John Cleary (1846-1914), and Margaret Cleary (1853-1898), née Smith, Patrick Francis Cleary was born at Kilmore, Victoria on 5 February 1874.

He married Jessie Maud Albinson (1887-1955) in 1907.

Death
He died at St Vincent's Hospital in Fitzroy on 1 April 1959.

Notes

References

External links 
 
 
 Pat Cleary's profile at Collingwood Forever

1874 births
1959 deaths
Australian rules footballers from Victoria (Australia)
Collingwood Football Club players